20th Century Fox is the former name of 20th Century Studios, an American film production studio owned by Disney.

20th Century Fox or Twentieth Century Fox may refer to:

 "Twentieth Century Fox" (song), a 1967 song by the American band The Doors
 Twentieth Century Fox Film Corp. v. iCraveTV, a U.S. copyright-infringement court case
 "Twentieth Century Fox," a song by 38 Special from their 1983 album Tour de Force

See also
 21st Century Fox, former parent company of 20th Century Fox
 21st Century Fox (disambiguation)